A chapter house or chapterhouse is a building or room that is part of a cathedral, monastery or collegiate church in which larger meetings are held.

Chapter house, Chapter House or Chapterhouse may also refer to:

 Chapterhouse (band), a British band 1987–1994
 Chapter house (Navajo Nation), an administrative, communal meeting place
 Chapterhouse: Dune, a 1985 science fiction novel by Frank Herbert
 Chapter House, a building associated with the American Woman's League
 Chapter House, a building associated with American college and university fraternities and sororities
 Chapterhouse Comics, a Canadian comic publishing company

See also